The George Hotel, at 10 N. Main in Kanosh, Utah, was built around 1887.  It was listed on the National Register of Historic Places in 2005.  The listing included three contributing buildings.

It is a one-and-a-half-story, T-shaped crosswing-plan dwelling, built of random sandstone ashlar masonry.  It reflects Classical, Gothic Revival, and Victorian Eclectic styles, but is overall mostly Gothic Revival.

It is a stone building which was built by James Gardner and William George.

References

Hotels in Utah
National Register of Historic Places in Millard County, Utah
Gothic Revival architecture in Utah
Buildings and structures completed in 1887